Waldy Dzikowski  (born 23 July 1959 in Wschowa) is a Polish politician. He was elected to the Sejm on 25 September 2005, getting 54,959 votes in 39 Poznań district as a candidate from the Civic Platform list.

He was also a member of Sejm 2001-2005, 2005-2007, 2007-2011, 2011–2015, 2015-2019, 2019-2023.

See also
Members of Polish Sejm 2005-2007

External links
 *Waldy Dzikowski - parliamentary page - includes declarations of interest, voting record, and transcripts of speeches.

1959 births
Living people
People from Wschowa
Civic Platform politicians
Members of the Polish Sejm 2001–2005
Members of the Polish Sejm 2005–2007
Members of the Polish Sejm 2007–2011
Members of the Polish Sejm 2011–2015
Members of the Polish Sejm 2015–2019
Members of the Polish Sejm 2019–2023
Poznań University of Technology alumni